Kevin Steuke (born 23 November 1992) is a German former professional footballer who played as a attacking midfielder.

External links
 
 

1992 births
Living people
German footballers
Association football midfielders
3. Liga players
Regionalliga players
Rot-Weiß Oberhausen players
TuS Koblenz players
SC Westfalia Herne players
FC Kray players
Sportspeople from Oberhausen
Footballers from North Rhine-Westphalia